7 Samurai Sessions -We're Kavki Boiz- is an album by Miyavi, released on July 18, 2007. It contains re-arrangements of previously published songs. It charted 44th on Oricon.

Track listing

References

2007 albums
Miyavi albums